Kadugur is a village in the Ariyalur taluk of Ariyalur district, Tamil Nadu, India.

Demographics 

As per the 2001 census, Kadugur had a total population of 3,924 with 2,014 males and 1,910 females.

Revenue villages
 Kadugur
 Ayan Athur
 K.Poyyur
 Poomudaiyanpatti
 Thalaiyarikudikadu
 Kopalan kudikadu (en) Koppilian kudikadu
 Nuraiyur

President of the village
 Mr.Dharmalingam - 2019

Nearest places      
 Govt Hospital - Kadugur
 Govt higher Secondary School - Ayan Aathur
 Govt primary School - Ayan Aathur, K.Poyyur, Thalaiyarikudikadu, Kopilian kudikadu
 Private Schools - Kadugur (Thirumurugan Aided Primary School)
Play Ground - APJ Abdul Kalam Cricket Ground

References 

Villages in Ariyalur district